The Four Musketeers may refer to:

 The principal characters in the Alexandre Dumas novel The Three Musketeers and its sequels once D'Artagnan is added as the fourth musketeer
 The Four Musketeers (tennis), French tennis players who dominated the game in the second half of the 1920s and early 1930s
 The Four Musketeers (1934 film), a German drama directed by Heinz Paul unrelated to the Dumas novels
 The Four Musketeers (1936 film), an Italian adventure film directed by Carlo Campogalliani
 The Four Musketeers (1963 film), an Italian-French film directed by Carlo Ludovico Bragaglia
 The Four Musketeers (1974 film), a film by Richard Lester
 The Four Musketeers (musical), a musical with a score by Laurie Johnson and lyrics by Herbert Kretzmer
 The Four Musketeers (1632), fictional characters in Eric Flint's 1632 series